Bailando 2014 was the ninth Argentinian season of Bailando por un Sueño. The season premiere was on April 28, 2014, hosted by Marcelo Tinelli. 28 couples competed.

The jury was reduced from six to four members in this season: returning judges Marcelo Polino and Moria Casán, joined by Soledad Silveyra and Nacha Guevara. Additionally, two former judges (Aníbal Pachano and Laura Fidalgo) are competitors in this season.

Norma Pons was to be part of the event, but due to a heart attack died on April 29. A day earlier, in the opening of the show, her last work for television was, where did Mirta, aunt of Marcelo Tinelli. Finally her sister Mimi Pons was chosen to replace her in the contest.

Comedians Anita Martínez and Marcos "Bicho" Gómez were revealed on December 19 as the winners over Hernán Piquín and Cecilia Figaredo with 59.42% of the public vote.

Couples

 Emanuel González was the original partner, but he left the competition after Cumbia's round.
 Paula Chaves left the competition, and professional partner Florencia Viterbo entered in her place.
 Lizy Tagliani enters the competition after round 8.
 Sixto Javier Valdés enters the competition after round 12.
 Rosmery González and Fátima Flórez enters the competition after round 14

Scoring chart

Red numbers indicate the lowest score for each week.
Green numbers indicate the highest score for each week.
 indicates the couple eliminated that week.
 indicates the couple was saved by the public or production.
 indicates the couple was saved by the jury.
 indicates the couple withdrew.
 indicates the winning couple.
 indicates the runner-up couple.
 indicates the semifinalists couples.

In round 2, Yanina Latorre was sentenced because she stopped her routines in the middle of the choreography.
In round 19, Anibal Pachano was sentenced because he had a fight with judge Moria Casan before the dance, refused to do the choreography and decided to go to the telephone vote.

Highest and lowest scoring performances 
The best and worst performances in each dance according to the judges' marks are as follows:

Styles, scores and songs
Secret vote is in bold text.

April

May

June

July

August

September

October

November

December

Duel

Semifinal and Final

 Replaced by Lolo Rossi.
 Replaced by Graciela Alfano.
 Remplaced by Angel de Brito.
 Remplaced by Flavio Mendoza.

References

Argentina
Argentine variety television shows
2014 Argentine television seasons